The 2014 Triglav Trophy was held on 2–6 April 2014. It was an international figure skating competition held annually in Jesenice, Slovenia. Skaters competed in the disciplines of men's and ladies' singles on the senior, junior, and novice levels.

Schedule

Senior results

Men

Ladies

Junior results

Men

Ladies

Novice results

Boys

Girls

References

External links
 2014 Triglav Trophy results

Triglav Trophy, 2014
Triglav Trophy